Alexander Joseph Gersbach (born 8 May 1997) is an Australian professional footballer who plays as a left back for MLS team Colorado Rapids and the Australia national team.

He made his debut for Australia in 2016, having previously played numerous times for the nation's youth teams.

Early life
Born in Auburn, Sydney to a father of German descent and a mother of Greek descent, Gersbach grew up in Sutherland, in Sydney's South East. For the majority of his school years he attended St Patrick's College, Sutherland, before leaving for the Australian Institute of Sport in Canberra where he also attended Canberra High School. Gersbach played his youth football for the Miranda Magpies and Sutherland Sharks where he played as a striker.

Club career

Sydney FC
On 20 July 2014, Sydney FC announced that they had signed Gersbach to a two-year deal. Alex was previously given the number 13 jersey, but later swapped with Christopher Naumoff for the number 16. Rated as one of Australia's most promising young footballers, he made his senior professional debut for the club at the age of 17 years and 3 months in the 2014 FFA Cup Round of 32 tie against Melbourne City FC at Morshead Park on 12 August 2014 which Sydney FC won 3–1 after extra time.

He made his A-League debut on 11 October 2014 against Melbourne City when he came on for Matthew Jurman after 69 minutes. He put in a promising performance as Sydney FC drew 1–1.

For the 2015–16 A-League season, Gersbach was given the number 3 jersey.

Rosenborg

On 31 January 2016, it was announced that Gersbach had signed with Norwegian club, Rosenborg BK of the Tippeligaen for a reported fee of $500,000. Gersbach made his Tippeligaen debut for Rosenborg on 19 March 2016 at home to Stromsgodset where he played a full 90 minutes in a 1–0 home victory.

Loan to Lens
On 22 January 2018, Lens announced the signing of Gersbach on a six-month loan deal, with the view to make it a permanent three-year deal at the end of his stint. Given the number 5 jersey, Gersbach made his debut in an unfamiliar centre-back role in a 1–0 loss to US Orléans.

NAC Breda
On 23 January 2019, NAC Breda announced the signing of Gersbach on a 2.5 year contract.

AGF
In July 2019, Gersbach moved to Denmark and joined AGF on a 3-year contract, also getting reunited with his former teammate from the national team Mustafa Amini.

Grenoble
On 31 August 2021, Gersbach secured a move to French Ligue 2 team Grenoble on a 2-year contract.

Colorado Rapids 
After playing two seasons for Grenoble, Gersbach joined Major League Soccer team Colorado Rapids on 30 January 2023 for a reported fee of €300.000. Gersbach signed a 3 year contract with a club-held option for the 2026 MLS season and occupies an international roster spot. Gersbach made his debut for the Rapids starting in a 4-0 defeat to Seattle Sounders FC on 26 February 2023.

International career
On 25 September 2015, Gersbach was selected to play for the Young Socceroos to play in the 2016 AFC U-19 Championship qualification. In March 2016 Gersbach received his first call up to the senior team when he was named in the squad to face Tajikistan and Jordan in World Cup Qualifiers on 24 and 29 March.

On 4 June 2016, Gersbach made his first international appearance for Australia, coming on for Brad Smith against Greece in the 82nd minute and later setting up Mathew Leckie's last second winner.

Career statistics

Club

International

Honours

Club
Rosenborg
Eliteserien: 2016, 2017, 2018
Norwegian Football Cup: 2016, 2018
Mesterfinalen: 2017

Individual
Harry Kewell Medal: 2017

See also
 List of foreign Norwegian Premier League players
 List of Sydney FC players

References

External links

1997 births
Living people
Association football defenders
Australian soccer players
Australia youth international soccer players
Australia under-20 international soccer players
Australia international soccer players
Australian people of German descent
Australian people of Greek descent
Australian expatriate soccer players
Sydney FC players
Rosenborg BK players
RC Lens players
NAC Breda players
Aarhus Gymnastikforening players
Grenoble Foot 38 players
Colorado Rapids players
A-League Men players
National Premier Leagues players
Ligue 2 players
Eliteserien players
Eredivisie players
Danish Superliga players
Expatriate footballers in France
Australian expatriate sportspeople in France
Expatriate footballers in Norway
Australian expatriate sportspeople in Norway
Expatriate footballers in the Netherlands
Australian expatriate sportspeople in the Netherlands
Expatriate men's footballers in Denmark
Australian expatriate sportspeople in Denmark
2017 FIFA Confederations Cup players
2019 AFC Asian Cup players